Kiska Harbor is an inlet on the east coast of the island of Kiska in the Aleutian Islands in Alaska.

Kiska Harbor is bounded by North Head on the north and by South Head on the south. Little Kiska Island lies off the coast of Kiska Island immediately east of Kiska Harbor.

During their occupation of Kiska Island from June 1942 to July 1943 during World War II, the Japanese used Kiska Harbor as a naval base.

Notes

References
Merriam-Webster's Geographical Dictionary, Third Edition. Springfield, Massachusetts: Merriam-Webster, Incorporated, 1997. .
Morison, Samuel Eliot. History of United States Naval Operations in World War II, Volume Seven: Aleutians, Gilberts, and Marshalls, June 1942-April 1944. Boston, Massachusetts: Little, Brown and Company, 1951.

Landforms of the Aleutian Islands
Bodies of water of Aleutians West Census Area, Alaska
Inlets of Alaska